Sotorasib, sold under the brand names Lumakras and Lumykras, is an anti-cancer medication used to treat non-small-cell lung cancer. It targets a specific mutation, G12C, in the protein K-Ras encoded by gene KRAS which is responsible for various forms of cancer. Sotorasib is an inhibitor of the RAS GTPase family.

The most common side effects include diarrhea, musculoskeletal pain, nausea, fatigue, liver damage and cough.

Sotorasib is the first approved targeted therapy for tumors with any KRAS mutation, which accounts for approximately 25% of mutations in non-small cell lung cancers. KRAS G12C mutations occur in about 13% of patients with non-small cell lung cancers. Sotorasib was approved for medical use in the United States in May 2021, and in the European Union in January 2022. The US Food and Drug Administration considers it to be a first-in-class medication.

Medical uses 
Sotorasib is indicated for the treatment of adults with KRAS G12C-mutated locally advanced or metastatic non-small cell lung cancer, as determined by a Food and Drug Administration-approved test, who have received at least one prior systemic therapy.

Clinical development
Sotorasib is being developed by Amgen. Phase I clinical trials were completed in 2020. In December 2019, it was approved to begin phase II clinical trials.

Because the G12C KRAS mutation is relatively common in some cancer types, 14% of non-small-cell lung cancer adenocarcinoma patients and 5% of colorectal cancer patients, and sotorasib is the first drug candidate to target this mutation, there have been high expectations for the drug.  The Food and Drug Administration has granted a fast track designation to sotorasib for the treatment of metastatic non-small-cell lung carcinoma with the G12C KRAS mutation.

Chemistry and pharmacology
Sotorasib can exist in either of two atropisomeric forms, and one is more active than the other.  It selectively forms an irreversible covalent bond to the sulfur atom in the cysteine residue that is present in the mutated form of KRAS, but not in the normal form.

History 
Researchers evaluated the efficacy of sotorasib in a study of 124 participants with locally advanced or metastatic KRAS G12C-mutated non-small cell lung cancer with disease progression after receiving an immune checkpoint inhibitor and/or platinum-based chemotherapy. The major outcomes measured were objective response rate (proportion of participants whose tumor is destroyed or reduced) and duration of response. The objective response rate was 36% and 58% of those participants had a duration of response of six months or longer.

The U.S. Food and Drug Administration (FDA) granted the application for sotorasib orphan drug, fast track, priority review, and breakthrough therapy designations. The FDA granted approval of Lumakras to Amgen Inc.

Society and culture

Economics 

Legal status 
In November 2021, the Committee for Medicinal Products for Human Use of the European Medicines Agency adopted a positive opinion, recommending the granting of a conditional marketing authorization for the medicinal product Lumykras, intended for the treatment of people with KRAS G12C mutation non-small cell lung cancer. The applicant for this medicinal product is Amgen Europe B.V. Sotorasib was approved for medical use in the European Union in January 2022.

Names 
Sotorasib is the recommended international nonproprietary name.

References

Further reading

External links 
 
 

Antineoplastic drugs
Breakthrough therapy
CYP3A4 inducers
Fluoroarenes
Piperazines
Pyridines
Orphan drugs